Temple Emanu-El is a Reform synagogue in Tucson, Arizona.  It was the first synagogue in the Arizona Territory and is the oldest congregation in the state; Emanuel's original building, known as the Stone Avenue Temple, is the oldest synagogue building in Arizona.

History

Although the Jewish community had been meeting for prayer for some years and had begun raising funds for a synagogue in 1905, the congregation was incorporated  March 20, 1910, as The Hebrew Benevolent Society  and dedicated the first synagogue building, the Stone Avenue Temple, the first synagogue built in the Arizona Territory, on Oct. 3, 1910, the eve of Rosh Hashanah, the Jewish New Year.  In 1949 the congregation moved to a new building on North Country Club.

Stone Avenue Temple

Emanu-El's original building, the  Stone Avenue Temple, was a brick structure designed by architect Ely Blount. Blount blended a pedimented, pilastered Greek revival facade with rounded windows and twin towers in Rundbogenstil style. In 1937 the building was covered with stucco. The original stained-glass windows have been lost. Since 1982, the building is listed in on the National Register of Historic Places as part of the Barrio Libre Historic District.   It currently houses the Jewish Heritage Center of the Southwest.

See also

 Jewish Heritage Center of the Southwest

References

External links
 Temple Emanu-El
  

Religious buildings and structures in Tucson, Arizona
Reform synagogues in Arizona
Jewish organizations established in 1910
1910 establishments in Arizona Territory
Synagogues on the National Register of Historic Places in Arizona
Synagogues completed in 1910
Synagogues completed in 1949